Chitti Chellelu is a 1970 Indian Telugu-language drama film, directed by M. Krishnan Nair and produced by AVM Productions. It stars N. T. Rama Rao, Vanisri and Rajasree, with music composed by S. Rajeswara Rao.

Plot 
Raghavayya becomes a drunkard after his wife's death. He has two children Raja and Santha. Raghavayya believes that Santha is responsible for his wife's death, that's why he ill-treats her, but Raja loves his sister more than his life. After some time, Raghavayya becomes a wanderer leaving the children alone and the sister's responsibility comes to Raja.

Once they meet Subbamma, a rich woman who is a widow in a temple, who gives shelter to them, she has a son named Raghu. Raghu and Raja become best friends, and from childhood, Raghu loves Santha. Years roll by, Subbamma passes away, and Raja takes care of the farm and agriculture of Raghu, who is studying in the city. The love and affection of Raja for his little sister Santha grows along with him, but the only thing that worries him is that Santha is sensitive and faints for petty things. Raja falls in love with his friend Sivalingam's sister Janaki.

Raghu completes his education and comes back to the village. Raja is felled up with joy when Raghu expresses his love for Santha and he happily performs their marriage. After that, Raghu gets a cashier job in a bank, so he leaves for the city and joins there. Raghavayya, the father of Raja becomes a notorious criminal, who wants to exchange his counterfeit currency in the bank with the original, that's why he tries to trap Raghu, and when he is not ready to listen, a conflict arises, Raghavayya stabs Raghu with his knife and his acolytes throw him on the road. Raghu is admitted to the hospital and before dying he gives a death statement by recognizing Raghavayya.

Raja gets a telegram to start immediately from the bank authorities and rushes to the city where he could not withstand the event. Now he is more worried about his sensitive sister, who is pregnant, hearing this news. He decides not to tell this tragedy to her, so, he keeps the entire sorrow in his heart and takes care of his sister. Once Janaki realizes that there is something wrong with Raja's behaviour and she somehow gets the truth from him. Then she consoles him to keep this as a secret until Santha delivers so that she would be alive at least for the baby.

Meanwhile, Raghavayya escapes from the police and reaches Raja's house with a lot of hunger. Santha feeds him and he bows down to her affection. Seeing his wife's photo he recognizes Santha as his daughter and he also learns that Raghu is her husband whom he has murdered. Now he decides to make penance for his sins so he surrenders himself to the police.

Meanwhile, Santha gets pain, and she is admitted to the hospital, she wants to see Raghu and asks Raja to call him. Raja did not know what to do. In frustration, he faints and comes to consciousness after listening to the baby cry. Unfortunately, Santha dies giving birth to the baby boy. Raja feels distressed because he has been left alone. When he tries to kill himself, Janaki prevents him, telling him that he should be alive for the baby, which is Santha's memory. The movie ends with Raja and Janaki taking care of the baby.

Cast 
N. T. Rama Rao as Raja
Vanisri as Santha
Rajasree as Janaki
Haranath as Raghu
Relangi as Sivalingam's father
Gummadi as Raghavayya
Padmanabham as Sivalingam
Balakrishna as Sanyasi
Geetanjali as Geeta
Surabhi Balasaraswathi as Balamma
Nirmalamma as Subbamma

Soundtrack 

The music was composed by S. Rajeswara Rao. The song "Ee Reyi Theyanadi" is based on the French song "L'amour est bleu".

References

External links 
 

Indian drama films
AVM Productions films
Films scored by S. Rajeswara Rao
1970s Telugu-language films
1970 drama films
1970 films